Noise & Flowers is a live album by Neil Young and Promise of the Real. It was released through Reprise Records on August 5, 2022, and recorded during the band's 2019 European tour.

Critical reception

Nick Roseblade of Clash called Noise & Flowers "a greatest hits selection worthy of [manager] Elliot Roberts' 50-year friendship with Neil Young" and "one of Neil Young's best live DVDs and one that should delight both old and new fans of his work".

Track listing

Charts

References

2022 live albums
Neil Young live albums
Lukas Nelson & Promise of the Real albums
Reprise Records live albums